Lake Naococane is a lake in northern Quebec, Canada. It is located in the eastern part of the municipality of Baie-James.

Lakes of Nord-du-Québec